Tanawara is a small village in Luni tehsil of Jodhpur district of Rajasthan in India. According to Census 2011 information the location code or village code of Tanawara village is 085537.

Location
Tanawara village is located in Luni Tehsil of Jodhpur district in Rajasthan, India. It is situated 15 km away from sub-district headquarter Luni and 12 km away from district headquarter Jodhpur. As per 2009 stats, Tanawara village is also a gram panchayat.

Area
The Total geographical area of Tanawara village is 1621 hectares. There are about 491 houses in Tanawara village.

Population

References

Villages in Jodhpur district